Allochrostes biornata, the ornate emerald, is a species of moth in the family Geometridae described by Louis Beethoven Prout in 1913. It is native to the Afrotropics, and has been recorded in the DRC, Kenya, Mozambique, Zimbabwe, South Africa and Namibia.

References

Geometrinae
Moths described in 1913
Moths of Africa